Miguel Salazar (born July 28, 1994) is a Mexican footballer who currently plays for Midland-Odessa Sockers FC in the National Premier Soccer League.

Career

College
Salazar played four years of college soccer at Elon University between 2012 and 2015.

While at college, Salazar appeared for Premier Development League side Carolina Dynamo in 2014.

Professional
Salazar signed with United Soccer League side San Antonio FC on February 15, 2016.

References

External links
 

1994 births
Living people
Mexican expatriate footballers
Mexican footballers
Elon Phoenix men's soccer players
North Carolina Fusion U23 players
San Antonio FC players
Soccer players from Arizona
Expatriate soccer players in the United States
USL League Two players
USL Championship players
Association football midfielders